Pristinailurus bristoli is a fossil species in the carnivoran family Ailuridae, well-represented in the Hemphillian deposits at the Gray Fossil Site in Gray, Tennessee. It was significantly larger than the living Ailurus but probably possessed a weaker bite. Males appear to have been as much as twice the size of females.

References 

Ailuridae
Miocene musteloids
Neogene mammals of North America
Prehistoric carnivoran genera